Michael Kellner (born 8 May 1977) is a German politician (Alliance 90/The Greens) who has been serving as a Member of the Bundestag representing electoral constituency Uckermark – Barnim I since 2021.

In addition to his parliamentary work, Kellner has been serving as Parliamentary State Secretary at the Federal Ministry for Economic Affairs and Climate Action in the coalition government of Chancellor Olaf Scholz since 2021. In this capacity, he is also the Commissioner for Small and Medium-Sized Enterprises.

Early life and education
After a stay at kibbutz in Israel, Kellner studied political science at the University of Potsdam from 1996 to 2002. In his thesis, he analyzed the relationship between the federal states of Berlin and Brandenburg.

Career
Kellner joined Alliance 90/The Greens in 1997.

From 2004 to 2009, Kellner worked as chief of staff to Claudia Roth in her capacity as member of the Green Party's national leadership. He subsequently became a legislative advisor to Frithjof Schmidt.

From 2013 to 2022, Kellner was his party's General Secretary. Following his switch into a government position, he was replaced in the role during a party convention in January 2022 by Emily Büning.

Other activities
 Helmholtz Association of German Research Centres, Ex-Officio Member of the Senate (since 2022)
 Heinrich Böll Foundation, Member of the Supervisory Board

Controversy
In early 2022, Kellner became one of the six subjects of an embezzlement investigation launched by the Berlin public prosecutor's office into the entire leadership board of the Green Party over the payment of so-called ‘corona bonuses,’ which had been paid in 2020 to all employees of the party's federal office and at the same time to its board.

Personal life
Kellner is married to Verena Graichen, who has been serving as deputy chair of the German Federation for the Environment and Nature Conservation (BUND) since 2019. They have two children and live in Berlin and Oberuckersee.

References 

1977 births
21st-century German politicians
Members of the Bundestag 2021–2025
Members of the Bundestag for Alliance 90/The Greens
Living people
Members of the Bundestag for Brandenburg
University of Potsdam alumni